West Platner Brook is a river in Delaware County, New York. It flows into Platner Brook northwest of Fraser.

References

Rivers of New York (state)
Rivers of Delaware County, New York
Tributaries of the West Branch Delaware River